Vauréal is a commune in the northwestern suburbs of Paris, France.

French chocolate maker Henri Menier (1853–1913) had a château in Vauréal and named the 70-metre-high Vauréal Falls on Anticosti Island in Quebec province of Canada after the town.

Population

Transportation
Vauréal is served by no station of the Paris Métro, RER, or suburban rail network. The closest station to Vauréal is Cergy – Le Haut station on Paris RER line A and on the Transilien Paris – Saint-Lazare suburban rail line. This station is located in the neighboring commune of Cergy,  from the town center of Vauréal.

Education
Schools include:
Eight primary schools
Two junior high schools (collèges): La Bussie and Les Toupets
One senior high school, Lycée Camille Claudel

See also
Communes of the Val-d'Oise department

References

External links

Official website 

Association of Mayors of the Val d'Oise 

Communes of Val-d'Oise
Cergy-Pontoise